Li Ruihuan (born September 17, 1934) is a Chinese retired politician. Li was a member of the Politburo Standing Committee of the Chinese Communist Party (CCP), China's top decision making body, between 1989 and 2002. Li served as Chairman of the 9th National Committee of the Chinese People's Political Consultative Conference (CPPCC) from 1993 to 2003; before that, he was the CCP secretary of Tianjin.

Biography
A native of Baodi, Tianjin, and originally a carpenter by trade, he was elected and reelected chairman of the 8th and 9th CPPCC National Committees in March 1993 and March 1998. Li Ruihuan is the sixth chairman of the CPPCC after Mao Zedong, Zhou Enlai, Deng Xiaoping, Deng Yingchao, and Li Xiannian. Since this post has been held by some of the most prominent revolutionary elders, it is spoken of "noble and sacred" by reverent observers. The principal duties of the CPPCC chief are mainly advisory and conciliatory; Li's duties focused on mitigating conflict between different sectors of society, conferring on state affairs, and providing ideas for the top bodies of PRC central government for reference. 

Li, born into ordinary peasant family in September 1934; worked as construction worker in Beijing Third Construction Company, 1951–1965; attended spare-time architecture engineering institute, 1958–1963; and received a college certificate. Li is known as the inventor of the "simplified calculation method," which updated the traditional "lofting method" in carpentry, Li was known as "young Lu Ban," a legendary master carpenter in ancient China. He rose up the ranks of the construction industry and Tianjin politics.

During his tenure of office as Tianjin mayor, he actively supported institutional restructuring, focusing attention on improving urban housing and public transport conditions. He gained great popularity among Tianjin residents with his call-in radio and television programs through which he directly answered residents' inquires in concrete terms.

In 1989, he became a member of the Politburo Standing Committee with Jiang Zemin and Song Ping, and became the chairman of CPPCC in 1993. Li Ruihuan retired in 2003 at age of 68. he reappeared the 20th Party Congress on 16 October 2022,

See also
 Politics of the People's Republic of China
 History of the People's Republic of China (1989-2002)

External links
Li Ruihuan biography @ China Vitae, the web's largest online database of China VIPs
Li Ruihuan profile at BBC news . Accessed September 2007

1934 births
Living people
Chairpersons of the National Committee of the Chinese People's Political Consultative Conference
Chinese carpenters
Chinese Communist Party politicians from Tianjin
Mayors of Tianjin
Members of the 13th Politburo Standing Committee of the Chinese Communist Party
Members of the 14th Politburo Standing Committee of the Chinese Communist Party
Members of the 15th Politburo Standing Committee of the Chinese Communist Party
People's Republic of China politicians from Tianjin
Dramatists of Chinese opera